Cianci is a surname. Notable people with the surname include:

Buddy Cianci, American politician, attorney, and political commentator
Cláudia Cianci, Portuguese tennis player
Hugo Cianci, French footballer
Pietro Cianci, Italian professional football striker

Italian-language surnames